My Father Sleeps is a 1944 mystery detective novel by the British writer Gladys Mitchell. It is the seventeenth in her long-running series featuring the psychoanalyst and amateur detective Mrs Bradley. It is set in the Western Highlands of Scotland.

Synopsis
While on a walking holiday the brother and sister-in-law of Mrs. Bradleys's secretary Laura Menzies encounter a strange local landowner Hector Loudoun who claims he is being pressured to sell ownership of one of his lochs.

References

Bibliography
 Klein, Kathleen Gregory. Great Women Mystery Writers: Classic to Contemporary. Greenwood Press, 1994.
 Miskimmin, Esme. 100 British Crime Writers. Springer Nature, 2020.
 Reilly, John M. Twentieth Century Crime & Mystery Writers. Springer, 2015.

1944 British novels
Novels by Gladys Mitchell
British crime novels
British mystery novels
British thriller novels
Novels set in Scotland
British detective novels
Michael Joseph books